Odeluga Joshua "Odel" Offiah (born 26 October 2002) is an English professional footballer who plays as a centre-back for the academy of Premier League club Brighton & Hove Albion.

Club career

Brighton & Hove Albion

In his youth, Offiah was a member of the Bromley academy, and in 2016 won the Kent Youth Cup with their U13 side before joining Brighton & Hove Albion's academy in 2017.

2021–22 season: First team debut
Offiah made his professional footballing debut on 24 August 2021, coming on as a 68th minute substitute for Taylor Richards in the 2–0 EFL Cup second round victory over Championship side Cardiff City. He made his first start for  the Seagulls on 8 January 2022, playing 55 minutes of the 2–1 – after extra-time – away win over West Bromwich Albion of the Championship in the FA Cup third round. On 31 January, Offiah committed his future with Brighton by signing a new contract that runs until June 2024.

Personal life
Offiah was born in Camden to Nigerian parents. He is the nephew of former Rugby League and Rugby Union player Martin Offiah MBE.

Career statistics

References

External links
Profile at the Brighton & Hove Albion F.C. website

2002 births
Living people
Footballers from the London Borough of Camden
English people of Ghanaian descent
English footballers
English people of Nigerian descent
Association football defenders
Brighton & Hove Albion F.C. players